Kurt Betschart born 25 August 1968 in Erstfeld Switzerland is a former professional cyclist. He was a Six Day Track specialist holding a world record 37 victories with the same partner, Bruno Risi. He had a total of 47 professional victories and represented Switzerland at the Olympic games. After sixteen years in professional cycling Kurt retired on 26 July 2006.

Olympic Games

2000 Summer Olympics - Sydney
 11th, Men's Madison (Track cycling)

Palmares

1991
 2nd in Giro del Lago Maggiore - GP Knorr (SUI)
 3rd, Six Days of Zürich (with Bruno Risi)
1992
 1st, Six Days of Dortmund (with Bruno Risi)
 3rd in Giro dei Sei Comuni (SUI)
 2nd in Giro del Lago Maggiore - GP Knorr (SUI)
 3rd, Six Days of München (GER)
 3rd in General Classification Niederoesterreich Rundfahrt (AUT)
 1st, Six Days of Zürich; + Bruno Risi
 2nd in General Classification GP Brissago (SUI)
1993
 1st, Six Days of Zürich (with Bruno Risi)
 1st, Six Days of Dortmund (with Bruno Risi)
 1st, Six Days of Ghent (with Bruno Risi)
 1st, Six Days of München (with Bruno Risi)
 2nd, National Team Pursuit Championship (with Bruno Risi/Büchler/Gisler)
 3rd, Six Days of Bremen (with Bruno Risi)
1994
 1st, Six-Days of København (DEN)(with Bruno Risi)
 1st, Six Days of München (with Bruno Risi)
 1st, Six-Days' of Bordeaux (FRA) (with Bruno Risi)
 3rd, Six Days of Antwerpen (BEL) (with Bruno Risi)
 2nd, Six Days of Bremen (GER)
 2nd, Six Days of Dortmund (GER)
 3rd in Hegiberg-Rundfahrt (SUI)
 3rd, Six Days of Köln (GER)
 2nd, Six Days of Stuttgart (GER)
 2nd, Six Days of Zürich (SUI)
1995
  European Madison Champion (with Bruno Risi)
 1st, Six Days of Bremen (with Bruno Risi)
 1st, Six Days of Köln (with Bruno Risi)
 1st, Six Days of Zürich; + Bruno Risi
 3rd World Madison Championship (with Bruno Risi), Bogota
 2nd, Six Days of Dortmund (GER)
 2nd, Six Days of Stuttgart (GER)
 3rd, Six Days of Herning (DEN)
1996
 1st, Six Days of Ghent (with Bruno Risi)
 1st, Six-Days of København (with Bruno Risi)
 1st, Six Days of Zürich (with Bruno Risi)
  2nd European Madison Championship (with Bruno Risi)
 2nd, National Team Pursuit Championship (with Bruno Risi/Gisler/Strüby)
 2nd, Six Days of Bassano del Grappa (ITA)
 2nd, Six Days of Bremen (GER)
 2nd, Six Days of München (GER)
 2nd, Six Days of Milan (ITA)
 2nd, Six Days of Stuttgart (GER)
 2nd in National Championship, Track, Team Pursuit, Elite, Switzerland, Zürich (SUI)
 3rd, Six Days of Dortmund (GER)
 3rd in Erstfeld (SUI)
1997
 1st, Six Days of Dortmund (with Bruno Risi)
 1st, Six-Days' of Leipzig (with Bruno Risi)
 1st, Six Days of München (with Bruno Risi)
  2nd European Madison Championship (with Bruno Risi)
 2nd in Bordeaux, Six Days (FRA)
 2nd in European Championship, Track, Madison, Elite
 2nd, Six Days of Stuttgart (GER)
 2nd, Six Days of Milan (ITA)
 2nd, Six Days of Zürich (SUI)
 3rd, Six Days of Herning (DEN)
 3rd, Six Days of Bremen (GER)
 3rd, Six Days of Bassano del Grappa (ITA)
1998
 1st, Six Days of München (with Bruno Risi)
 1st, Six Days of Stuttgart (with Bruno Risi)
 1st, Six Days of Herning (with Bruno Risi)
 1st, Six Days of Zürich (with Bruno Risi)
 2nd, Six Days of Dortmund (GER)
 3rd, Six Days of Bremen (GER)
 3rd, Six-Days of København (DEN)
 3rd in Hyères, Madison, Hyères (FRA)
1999
 1st, Six Days of Bremen (with Bruno Risi)
 1st, Six Days of Dortmund (with Bruno Risi)
 1st, Six Days of Zürich (with Bruno Risi)
 2nd, Six Days of München (GER)
 2nd, Six Days of Fiorenzuola d' Arda (ITA)
2000
 1st, Six Days of München (with Bruno Risi)
 1st, Six Days of Zürich (with Bruno Risi, Markus Zberg)
  3rd European Madison Championship (with Bruno Risi)
 3rd, Six Days of Dortmund (GER)
 3rd, Six Days of Fiorenzuola d' Arda (ITA)
2001
 1st in National Championship, Track, Points race, Zürich, Switzerland
  3rd European Madison Championship (with Bruno Risi)
 1st in Dachau (GER)
 2nd, Six Days of Dortmund (GER)
 2nd, Six Days of Ghent (BEL)
 2nd, Six Days of München (GER)
 2nd, Six Days of Torino (ITA)
 3rd, Six Days of Zürich (SUI)
 3rd in Weil-am-Rhein (GER)
 2nd in Silenen - Amsteg - Bristen (SUI)
2002
 1st, Six Days of Bremen (with Bruno Risi)
 1st, Six Days of Ghent (with Bruno Risi)
 1st, Six Days of Stuttgart (with Bruno Risi)
  2nd European Madison Championship (with Bruno Risi)
 1st in Silenen - Amsteg - Bristen (SUI)
 1st in Stadtkriterium Thun (SUI)
 1st in Osnabrück, Derny (GER)
 2nd, Six Days of München (GER)
 2nd in City Night Rhede, Derny (GER)
 2nd in Rominger Classic, Engelberg (SUI)
 3rd, Six Days of Dortmund (GER)
 3rd, Six Days of Torino (ITA)
 3rd, Six-Days of København (DEN)
 3rd in Stuttgart-Hohenheim (GER)
2003
  European Madison Championship (with Bruno Risi)
 1st, Six Days of Berlin (with Bruno Risi)
 1st, Six Days of Dortmund (with Bruno Risi)
 1st, Six Days of München (with Bruno Risi)
 2nd, Six Days of Amsterdam (NED)
 1st in Osnabrück (GER)
 1st in Dachau (GER)
 3rd in Chur - Arosa (SUI)
 2nd in Stage 1 Rominger Classic (SUI)
 2nd in Stage 2 Rominger Classic (SUI)
 3rd in Trois Jours d'Aigle (SUI)
 3rd, Six Days of Ghent (BEL)
 3rd in Schattdorf (SUI)
2004
 1st, Six Days of Bremen (with Bruno Risi)
 1st in Silenen - Amsteg - Bristen (SUI)
 1st in Gelsenkirchen (b) (GER)
 2nd, Six Days of Stuttgart (GER)
 2nd, Six Days of Amsterdam (NED)
 3rd in Einhausen - Entega GP (GER)
 3rd in Dahme Trophy (GER)
2005
 1st, Six Days of Stuttgart (with Bruno Risi & Franco Marvulli)
 1st, Six Days of Amsterdam (with Bruno Risi)
 1st, Six Days of Berlin (with Bruno Risi)
 2nd, Six Days of Rotterdam (NED)
 2nd, Six Days of Bremen (GER)
 2nd in Trois Jours d'Aigle (SUI)
 2nd, Six Days of Dortmund (GER)
 3rd, Six Days of München (GER)
 3rd, Six Days of Ghent (BEL)
2006
 2nd, Six-Days of København (DEN)
 3rd, Six Days of Stuttgart (GER)

References

External links 
 Swiss cycling track Web site with information about Betschart

Wins at the Ghent six day 1993,1996,2002
 Wikipedia page in German
 Rider profile

1968 births
Living people
People from the canton of Uri
Swiss male cyclists
Swiss track cyclists
Cyclists at the 2000 Summer Olympics
Olympic cyclists of Switzerland